Georges Blanchard (1877–1954) was a French military officer. He served in the French Army in World War I on the Western Front. In World War II, he was a general, commanding the French First Army, which advanced into Belgium during the Battle of Belgium.

Military career

World War I: 1914–1918 
During World War I, he served on the Western Front against the Germans.

Interwar period: 1918–1939 
From 1927 to 1930 Blanchard was the deputy chief of staff for the French Army of the Rhine. From 1930 to 1932 Blanchard was chief of staff to General Adolphe Guillaumat. In 1932 he was promoted to general, and commanded the artillery of the 2nd Military Region. From 1935 to 1938 Blanchard was commanding general of the 7th Military Region. In 1938 and 1939 he was a member of France's Supreme War Council, director of the Centre des hautes études militaires (Centre of Military High Studies) and Inspector-General for the Centres of Higher Military Education.

World War II: 1939–1940 
Blanchard was appointed to command the First Army on 2 September 1939. The First Army encountered German armored forces at the Battle of Hannut in May 1940 with success but was forced to fall back to Lille after other French and Allied formations started to retreat. Blanchard took over the First French Army Group on 23 May 1940 following the accidental death of General Gaston Billotte. At Lille and Dunkirk, the First Army Group provided a blocking force that permitted the evacuation of Dunkirk. The First Army Group ceased to exist on 29 May 1940, six days after Blanchard took command. After a time as inspector of the 9th and 12th Military Regions for the Vichy regime, he retired in 1940.

Blanchard was awarded the Grand Cross of the Legion of Honour in early June 1940 by French premier Paul Reynaud at the recommendation of Maxime Weygand, in honor of his actions which allowed the escape of so many soldiers at Dunkirk.  Blanchard died on November 23, 1954.

Notes

References

1877 births
1954 deaths
French military personnel of World War I
French Army generals of World War II
Grand Croix of the Légion d'honneur